Ooidius is a genus of beetles in the family Carabidae, containing the following species:

 Ooidius advolans (Nietner, 1857)
 Ooidius crassiceps G. Muller, 1942
 Ooidius dorsiger (Klug, 1853)
 Ooidius ephippium (Dejean, 1829)
 Ooidius madecassus (Jeannel, 1948)
 Ooidius sellatus (Dejean, 1831)

References

Harpalinae